The 1930 International Lawn Tennis Challenge was the 25th edition of what is now known as the Davis Cup. For the silver anniversary, 24 teams would enter the Europe Zone, while 4 would enter the America Zone.

The United States defeated Italy in the Inter-Zonal play-off, but would lose to France in the Challenge Round, giving France their fourth straight title, in the sixth straight Challenge Round matchup between these teams. The final was played at Stade Roland Garros in Paris, France on 25–27 July.

America Zone

Draw

Final
United States vs. Mexico

Europe Zone

Draw

Final
Italy vs. Japan

Inter-Zonal Final
United States vs. Italy

Challenge Round
France vs. United States

See also
 1930 Wightman Cup

References

External links
Davis Cup official website

Davis Cups by year
 
International Lawn Tennis Challenge
International Lawn Tennis Challenge
International Lawn Tennis Challenge
International Lawn Tennis Challenge